Yak Bondy (born 8 July 1962 as Jerk Bondy in Goslar, Germany) is a London-based music producer, composer and visual artist. Bondy has been professionally involved in the music industry since the 1980s. After moving from Hannover (Germany) to London in 1987 to compose the soundtrack for a documentary series, Bondy has worked with many international artists.

Career highlights include being musical director and keyboard player for Lisa Stansfield's world tour, remixing M People and Annie Lennox, working with Grammy-winning A.R. Rahman, producing songs by Diane Warren and Melanie C, as well as writing and producing albums for UK stars S Club 7 and former Spice Girl Emma Bunton, resulting in dozens of Gold and Platinum awards.

As a film music composer and orchestrator Bondy works with the music licensing service, Hollywood Elite Music & Media in Los Angeles.

Bondy's audiovisual art and motion graphics appear on the digital platform Blackdove in Miami.

Musical Career
Bondy worked as keyboard player and musical director on Lisa Stansfield's first world tour, which included appearances on The Arsenio Hall Show and Late Night with David Letterman. The tour ended with a performance at Rock in Rio 1991. Bondy worked as a music programmer with Indian musician A.R. Rahman on his 1997 studio album Vande Mataram. In 2000, Bondy was credited with keyboards and programming in Pokémon: The Movie 2000. In 2004, Bondy had both producer and songwriting credits on the album Free Me, from former Spice Girl, Emma Bunton. One of the songs on the album co-written by Bondy, "Maybe", debuted at number 6 on the UK Singles Chart, and later a remixed version rose to number 6 in the US on the Billboard Hot Dance Club Play. Bondy also co-wrote and produced the song, "Just a Little Girl" with Amy Studt.  The song rose as high as number 14 on the UK Singles Chart.

While Bondy's most notable achievements were with Bunton and Studt, he has also worked with notable performers such as Rachel Stevens, S Club 8 and S Club 7. Bondy is also credited on the 2004 album from Alexander Klaws, Here I Am, which debuted at number 1 on the German Album Charts. Klaws was the winner of Deutschland sucht den Superstar, the German entry in the Idol franchise. Under the same franchise Bondy is credited as composer for the 2006 Singapore Idol winner's song, "You Give Me Wings" with Hady Mirza, with both single and debut album reaching number 1 chart position.

Bondy works as a senior songwriting tutor at BIMM, in London

Artistic Career
As a digital motion artist Bondy combines music and AI-driven visuals into moving works of art and sound.

His six-image series entitled "Lava Chroma" is inspired by lava lamps of the hippie era with colorful fluid shapes, described by art platform Blackdove as "exuding warmth and joy". The audio of all images played simultaneously results in one harmonic chord stack. 

A larger series "Living Tarots" features cards of the Tarot deck in a contemporary Cubist style. The cyclical wavelike animation reveals the hidden wireframe as scratch art. Each piece is accompanied by an original composition matching the purported symbolism of each card, characterized by one curator as "With soft motion and luxurious design, these tarots are alive from within."

Discography - Albums/EPs

Discography - Singles/Songs

Filmography

Live Performances/Touring

References

Living people
1962 births
Place of birth missing (living people)
German keyboardists
British record producers
German percussionists
German pianists
German songwriters
German record producers
British songwriters